"Alone" is a song by American singer Halsey from her second studio album Hopeless Fountain Kingdom (2017). A remixed version of the song featuring American rapper Big Sean and British rapper Stefflon Don was released on March 15, 2018 through Astralwerks as the third and final single from the album.

Background
"Alone" contains a sample from "Nothing Can Stop Me", written by Tony Hester and recorded by Marilyn McCoo and Billy Davis Jr. "Alone" follows "kinda like this Gatsby vibe," as stated by Halsey. It's about a social butterfly at the house party (which is a parallel to the masquerade ball in Romeo and Juilet) referenced in "Heaven In Hiding" and "Strangers". It is the second character's perspective of this party, with "Heaven In Hiding" acting as the first character's perspective.

Music video
The music video was directed by Halsey with Hannah Lux Davis and released on April 6, 2018, it starts with Halsey walking on a street going to a masquerade ball, she starts dancing before noticing her former lover on the balcony hanging with another woman while various flashbacks from the "Now or Never" music video are shown. She starts getting confused and runs to a fountain to vomit and Big Sean's character is there to console her and Stefflon Don is shown rapping her verse and wearing a red dress. The video ends with Halsey celebrating her happiness as confetti falls down, with her former lover staring at her confused by a note she left for him.

Live performances
Halsey performed "Alone" live on Sounds Like Friday Night on April 6, 2018. This was also her first UK television performance. In May, she performed the song on The Voice.

Track listings
Digital download
"Alone"   – 3:27

Digital download – Calvin Harris Remix
"Alone"   – 3:19

Charts

Weekly charts

Calvin Harris remix

Year-end charts

Certifications

Release history

References

2018 singles
2017 songs
Astralwerks singles
Halsey (singer) songs
Music videos directed by Hannah Lux Davis
Songs written by Halsey (singer)
Songs written by Ricky Reed
Songs written by Dan Wilson (musician)
Big Sean songs
Stefflon Don songs
Songs written by Big Sean
Songs written by Stefflon Don